Mitzi McCall is an American comedian and actress.

Life and career

Television 
In the early 1950s, then known as Mitzi Steiner, McCall had the Kiddie Castle program on KDKA-TV in Pittsburgh, Pennsylvania. She received national attention in 1952 via an Associated Press story about a five-year-old Pittsburgh girl with a cleft palate who spoke her first words while watching the actress in a pantomime on television. Afterward, doctors "didn't know what to say. They held a special meeting, examined Claire, and told the happy parents that she was cured."

In 1953, she was featured on Studio 10, a program on KGTV in San Diego, California. She performed in productions at The Pittsburgh Playhouse before heading to Hollywood.

She appeared on Rowan & Martin's Laugh-In. and was also a series regular on such television series as Life Goes On and (with her husband) on Silk Stalkings. On animated series, she provided the voice of Auntie Marina in Snorks, the voice of Mother Goose in Mother Goose and Grimm,  the voice of Sylvia Jenkins in Free for All, and a variety of voices on The Paw Paws. She played Miriam Lerner on Alright Already. Other credits include guest appearances on The Twilight Zone, Maude, Dharma & Greg, Chuck, as well as voice over work for many cartoons. In 1971, she was the voice of Penny on The Flintstones spin-off The Pebbles and Bamm-Bamm Show. She was a panelist on the game show Match Game during its 1970s revival, and appeared with Charlie Brill on Tattletales.

McCall and Brill 
McCall and Charlie Brill appeared on The Ed Sullivan Show on February 9, 1964, the episode that featured the U.S. television debut of The Beatles. Their act can be seen on the DVD of the Beatles' appearances on the Sullivan show.  They were interviewed in 2005 for the "Big Break" episode of Public Radio International radio program This American Life, regarding their Beatles-Sullivan experience, including a dressing room encounter with John Lennon.

They were spotted in 1963 while performing together in Honolulu by the Australian television producer John Collins, who produced The Tonight Show for TCN-9 in Sydney. Collins was seeking a replacement for the then unknown Irish comedian Dave Allen, who had hosted the program for the previous two seasons and wanted to return to Ireland. Collins approached them and they agreed but could not start an Australian engagement until their Hawaiian engagement was complete. They recommended an American comedian, their friend Don Lane, who was also working in Hawaii, to fill in during the meantime. Collins agreed to this. Lane started his Australian engagement and was an immediate success. Ratings were sensational and the network was delighted. It was going to be difficult if not impossible to replace him once the Brills became available. When they did, the preference was obvious and their engagement was cancelled after six weeks. Lane resumed their spot and remained successful in Australian television for the ensuing thirty-five years.

In 1967, McCall and Brill had a comedy recording, From Our Point of View, released by ABC Records. Later that year, the duo signed with Congressional Records.

Shawlee and McCall 
In the early 1960s, McCall and actress Joan Shawlee formed a night club act, first appearing together at the Club Robaire in Cleveland. In January 1961, syndicated newspaper columnist Dorothy Kilgallen reported that the team was "causing quite a stir", emphasizing while exaggerating the partners' discrepancy in height, "Joan being six feet, three inches tall and Mitzi four feet, 10 inches short".

In 2009, McCall had a supporting role as Bonnie in the film World's Greatest Dad.

Personal life
In the early 1950s, McCall was married to Jack Tolen, a television director and production manager. She and Charlie Brill met in 1959 and married the following year. They have a daughter, Jennifer, a former yoga instructor in Southern California.

Filmography

Films

 You're Never Too Young - Skeets Powell (1955)
 Machine-Gun Kelly - Harriet (uncredited) (1958)
 War of the Satellites - Mitzi (1958)
 The Cry Baby Killer - Evelyn (1958)
 Deep Blood - Ben's Mother (1989)
 White Palace - Sophie Rosen (1990)
 The Opposite Sex and How to Live with Them - Freida Crown (1992)
 EDtv - Fig Lady (1999)
 Hard Four - Myrna Segal (2007)
 World's Greatest Dad - Bonnie (2009)
 Crimson Peak - Additional voices (2015)

Television series

 Rowan & Martin's Laugh-In - "herself" in "The Fun Couple" sketches (1968-1969)
 Maude - Estelle Ellinger (Episode: "Nostalgia Party") (1974)
 Family - Sally (Episode: "Princess in the Tower") (1978)
 Life Goes On - Midge (1991-1992)
 Silk Stalkings - Fran Lipschitz (1993-1999)
 Seinfeld - Donna (Episode: "The Secretary") (1994)
 Ellen - Rochelle Shapiro (Episode: "Too Hip for the Room") (1996)
 Alright Already - Miriam Lerner (1997-1998)
 Caroline in the City - Lois (Episode: "Caroline and the Little White Lies") (1998)
 Becker - Mrs. Gould (Episode: "Hate Thy Neighbor") (1999)
 Dharma & Greg - Florence (Episode: "With a Little Help from My Friend") (2001)
 The Suite Life of Zack and Cody - Doreen (Episode "Club Twin") (2007)
 Hannah Montana - Woman (Episode: "My Best Friend's Boyfriend") (2007)
 Chuck - Blanche (Episode: "Chuck Versus the Broken Heart") (2009)

Animation

Video games

References

External links

Living people
American film actresses
American voice actresses
American television actresses
American women comedians
Actresses from Pittsburgh
21st-century American women
Year of birth missing (living people)